Jeffery Ryan Hougland (born August 2, 1978) is a retired American professional mixed martial artist. A professional from 2002 until 2012, he competed for the UFC and WEC.

Mixed martial arts career

Early career
Hougland started fighting professionally in 2002. He fought once for World Extreme Cagefighting (WEC) at WEC 6 and lost to future Strikeforce Lightweight Champion Gilbert Melendez via second-round TKO. After losing his next fight, he won eight fights in a row. He then signed with the UFC.

Ultimate Fighting Championship
Hougland made his promotional debut at UFC 132 against fellow UFC newcomer Donny Walker. Hougland showed off an excellent ground game with multiple submission attempts throughout all three rounds. Hougland won the fight via unanimous decision (29-28, 29-28, 30-27).

Hougland's second UFC outing was expected to take place against Mike Easton on October 1, 2011 at UFC on Versus 6. However, Hougland was forced out of the bout with an injury and replaced by Byron Bloodworth.

Hougland was briefly linked to a bout against Renan Barão on July 7, 2012 at UFC 148. However, Hougland served as a replacement for Mike Easton and faced Yves Jabouin on May 15, 2012 at UFC on Fuel TV: Korean Zombie vs. Poirier. Hougland lost the fight via unanimous decision after getting dominated by Jabouin's superior standup.

He was expected to face Takeya Mizugaki at UFC 151 on September 1, 2012.  However, after UFC 151 was cancelled, his bout with Mizugaki was rescheduled for November 10, 2012 at UFC on Fuel TV 6. Hougland was dominated for all three rounds, losing via unanimous decision (30-25, 30-27, 30-27). Hougland was subsequently released from the promotion.

Mixed martial arts record

|-
|Loss
|align=center| 10–6
|Takeya Mizugaki
|Decision (unanimous)
|UFC on Fuel TV: Franklin vs. Le
|
|align=center|3
|align=center|5:00
|Macau, SAR, China
|
|-
|Loss
|align=center| 10–5
|Yves Jabouin
|Decision (unanimous)
|UFC on Fuel TV: Korean Zombie vs. Poirier
|
|align=center|3
|align=center|5:00
|Fairfax, Virginia, United States
|
|-
|Win
|align=center| 10–4
|Donny Walker
|Decision (unanimous)
|UFC 132
|
|align=center|3
|align=center|5:00
|Las Vegas, Nevada, United States
|Bantamweight debut.
|-
|Win
|align=center| 9–4
|Craig Ross
|Submission (guillotine choke)
|Rumble on the Ridge 18
|
|align=center|1
|align=center|1:06
|Snoqualmie, Washington, United States
|
|-
|Win
|align=center| 8–4
|Omar Avelar
|Submission (rear-naked choke) 
|Rumble on the Ridge 16
|
|align=center|1
|align=center|3:45
|Snoqualmie, Washington, United States
|
|-
|Win
|align=center| 7–4
|Jeremy Burnett
|Submission (armbar)  
|ROTR 13: Redemption
|
|align=center|1
|align=center|3:34
|Snoqualmie, Washington, United States
|
|-
|Win
|align=center| 6–4
|Roy Bradshaw
|Submission (rear-naked choke)
|Rumble on the Ridge 11
|
|align=center|1
|align=center|1:25
|Snoqualmie, Washington, United States
|
|-
|Win
|align=center| 5–4
|Rusty Simpson
|TKO (punches)
|IFC Warriors Challenge 21
|
|align=center|1
|align=center|0:53
|Tuolumne, California, United States
|
|-
|Win
|align=center| 4–4
|Josh Gardner
|Decision  
|GC 48: All Stars
|
|align=center|2
|align=center|5:00
|Porterville, California, United States
|
|-
|Win
|align=center| 3–4
|Chris McMillen
|Submission (armbar) 
|GC 37: Throwdown
|
|align=center|1
|align=center|1:55
|Porterville, California, United States
|
|-
|Win
|align=center| 2–4
|Julian Samaniego
|Submission (armbar)
|GC 35: Cold Fury
|
|align=center|2
|align=center|0:52
|Porterville, California, United States
|
|-
|Loss
|align=center| 1–4
|Glen Cordoza
|Submission (rear-naked choke) 
|IFC WC 18: Big Valley Brawl
|
|align=center|1
|align=center|1:53
|Lakeport, California, United States
|
|-
|Loss
|align=center| 1–3
|Gilbert Melendez
|TKO (punches)
|WEC 6: Return of a Legend
|
|align=center|2
|align=center|2:05
|Lemoore, California, United States
|
|-
|Loss
|align=center| 1–2
|Randy Spence
|Submission (armbar)
|IFC: Night of the Warriors 3
|
|align=center|1
|align=center|2:44
|Ione, California, United States
|
|-
|Loss
|align=center| 1–1
|Mike Penalber
|Submission (heel hook)
|UA 4: King of the Mountain
|
|align=center|1
|align=center|3:53
|Auberry, California, United States
|
|-
|Win
|align=center| 1–0
|Rusty Simpson
|Submission (rear-naked choke)
|IFC: Warriors Challenge 17
|
|align=center|1
|align=center|4:11
|Porterville, California, United States
|
|-

References

External links 
Official UFC Profile

Jeff Hougland wins his UFC Debut

1978 births
Living people
Sportspeople from Chicago
American male mixed martial artists
Bantamweight mixed martial artists
Featherweight mixed martial artists
Lightweight mixed martial artists
Mixed martial artists utilizing Brazilian jiu-jitsu
American practitioners of Brazilian jiu-jitsu
People awarded a black belt in Brazilian jiu-jitsu
People from Enumclaw, Washington
Ultimate Fighting Championship male fighters